Grasmere, British Columbia, Canada elevation 869m, is a tiny hamlet in the East Kootenay region of British Columbia within the Regional District of East Kootenay, British Columbia. It is located on the east side of Lake Koocanusa, below the mouth of the Elk River, and to the southeast of the city of Cranbrook, and 15 km north of the Canada–United States border and the state of Montana. The city of Fernie is located nearby farther up the Elk River.

Grasmere has a population of 150 people, the majority of the workforce being employed in the timber, farming or mining industries in the nearby region. Grasmere is located within the Galton mountain range of the Canadian Rockies. The area is served by one school, Grasmere Elementary School. The name of the community was provided by a student, Warren Lancaster, in a competition in the early 20th century. It is named after the town of Grasmere in northern England's Lake District.

Climate
Grasmere has a warm summer humid continental climate, [Köppen Dfb]

References

Unincorporated settlements in British Columbia
Populated places in the Regional District of East Kootenay